Sułów  is a village in Zamość County, Lublin Voivodeship, in eastern Poland. It is the seat of the gmina (administrative district) called Gmina Sułów.

The village has a population of 460.

References

Villages in Zamość County
Kholm Governorate